Joan Heal (17 October 1922 – 12 April 1998) was an English actress and singer, known for her appearances in revue in the 1940s and 1950s.

Life and career
Heal was born in Vobster, Somerset, and educated at Bath High School and later the Old Vic School. She made her first professional appearance as Mrs Terence in Emlyn Williams' psycho-thriller Night Must Fall in 1940 at the Garden Theatre, Bideford, after which she was in the chorus of a revue at the Saville Theatre, London. Her first prominent role in revue was at the Cambridge Theatre in Sauce Tartare in 1949. This was followed by Sauce Piquante at the same theatre in 1950. In 1951, she was in the Lyric Revue with Ian Carmichael, Dora Bryan and Graham Payn at the Lyric Theatre, Hammersmith. The show transferred to the Globe Theatre in the West End, and was followed by a sequel in 1952. After further revue work, Heal was cast in the leading role of Virginia Jones in a new British musical Grab Me a Gondola, which became, in the words of The Times "a huge and completely unexpected success". After pre-West-End performances in Windsor and Hammersmith it transferred to the West End, and ran for a total of 673 performances, until mid-1958.

Heal played at the Bristol Old Vic in 1959 as Katherina in The Taming of the Shrew. In the 1960s she joined the repertory company of the Nottingham Playhouse for two seasons. She returned to West End musicals as Madam K in Sandy Wilson 's Divorce Me, Darling!. In 1966 she appeared in her last revue, The Decline and Fall of the Entire World as Seen through the Eyes of Cole Porter at the Criterion Theatre. The last stage of her career was at the Young Vic, where she became a mother-figure to the predominantly youthful company.

In her later years, Heal suffered from multiple sclerosis. She died on 12 April 1998 at the age of 75. She was twice married, both times to actors: first Jeremy Hawk and secondly David Conyers. Both marriages ended in divorce. She was survived by the daughter of her first marriage (the actress Belinda Lang) and the son of her second.

References

Sources

 

1922 births
1998 deaths
English stage actresses
20th-century English actresses